= 9/3 =

9/3 may refer to:

- September 3 (month-day date notation)
- March 9 (day-month date notation)
